The 1995 Big East men's basketball tournament took place at Madison Square Garden in New York City, from March 9 to March 12, 1995. Its winner received the Big East Conference's automatic bid to the 1995 NCAA tournament. It is a single-elimination tournament with four rounds.  Connecticut finished with the best regular season conference and was awarded the #1 seed.

Villanova defeated Connecticut, 94–78, in the championship game to claim its first Big East tournament championship.

Bracket

Awards
Dave Gavitt Trophy (Most Valuable Player): Kerry Kittles, Villanova

All Tournament Team
 Danya Abrams, Boston College
 Ray Allen, Connecticut
 Austin Croshere, Providence
 Allen Iverson, Georgetown
 Kerry Kittles, Villanova
 Jason Lawson, Villanova

References
General:  

Tournament
Big East men's basketball tournament
Basketball in New York City
College sports in New York City
Sports competitions in New York City
Sports in Manhattan
Big East men's basketball tournament
Big East men's basketball tournament
1990s in Manhattan
Madison Square Garden